Events in 2004 in Japanese television.

Debuts

Ongoing shows
Music Fair, music (1964–present)
Mito Kōmon, jidaigeki (1969–2011)
Sazae-san, anime (1969–present)
FNS Music Festival, music (1974–present)
Panel Quiz Attack 25, game show (1975–present)
Doraemon, anime (1979–2005)
Soreike! Anpanman. anime (1988–present)
Downtown no Gaki no Tsukai ya Arahende!!, game show (1989–present)
Crayon Shin-chan, anime (1992–present)
Shima Shima Tora no Shimajirō, anime (1993–2008)
Nintama Rantarō, anime (1993–present)
Chibi Maruko-chan, anime (1995–present)
Detective Conan, anime (1996–present)
SASUKE, sports (1997–present)
Ojarumaru, anime (1998–present)
One Piece, anime (1999–present)
The Prince of Tennis, anime (2001–2005)
Kitty's Paradise Fresh, children's variety (2002–2005)
Pocket Monsters Advanced Generation, anime (2002–2006)
Naruto, anime (2002–2007)
Bobobo-bo Bo-bobo, anime (2003–2005)
Konjiki no Gash Bell!!, anime (2003–2006)

Endings

See also
2004 in anime
List of Japanese television dramas
2004 in Japan
List of Japanese films of 2004

References